Japanese School at the Japanese Embassy in Warsaw (在ポーランド日本国大使館付属ワルシャワ日本人学校 Zai Pōrando Nihonkoku Taishikan Fuzoku Warushawa Nihonjin Gakkō), or The Japanese School in Warsaw, is a Japanese international school in Warsaw, Poland.

References

Further reading
 Teramoto, Manabu (寺本 学; Shimane University, Faculty of Education). "ワルシャワ日本人学校と国語科実践報告(1991年4月から1994年3月までの活動と実態を中心に)." 国語教育論叢 5, 87–104, 1995-09-01. Shimane University. See profile at CiNii.

External links

  The Japanese School in Warsaw
  The Japanese School in Warsaw (Archive)

Warsaw
International schools in Warsaw
Japan–Poland relations